Samer Foz (born May 20, 1973), also known as Samer Zuhair Foz, is a Syrian businessman with close ties to the Syrian government of Bashar al-Assad.

Business activities 
He is the Chairman and General Manager of Aman Holding, which was formerly known as the Aman Group, which owns the Four Seasons Hotel Damascus. The company had bought the stake in the hotel of Saudi prince Alwaleed bin Talal in the hotel while he was detained at the Ritz Carlton during the Saudi purge. The Syrian government is the second largest stakeholder in the hotel. In August 2017, Aman Group announced a partnership with Damascus governorate, under its company Damascus Cham Holding,  in building a luxury development called Marota City in the Basateen al-Razi area in the Mezzeh district of Damascus. In November 2017, Damascus Cham Holding granted Aman Group the right to develop real estate projects worth $312m as part of the project.

His business interests significantly expanded during the Syrian civil war into aviation, the cable industry, steel, sugar, car assembly and distribution, hotel management, real estate development, pharmaceuticals and banking.

Controversies

Sanctions 
He is sanctioned by the European Union and US Treasury  for having "leveraged the atrocities of the Syrian conflict into a profit-generating enterprise [and being] directly supporting the murderous Assad regime and building luxury developments on land stolen from those fleeing his brutality."

Facilitation of trade with ISIS 
Samer Foz reportedly transported grain from Syrian government-controlled areas to territory controlled by ISIS. According to other reports, he also moved wheat from ISIS-controlled areas through Turkey into Syrian regime-controlled territory.

References 

People named in the Panama Papers
Syrian businesspeople
Living people
1973 births
People of the Syrian civil war
Sanctioned due to Syrian civil war
Syrian individuals subject to U.S. Department of the Treasury sanctions
Syrian individuals subject to the European Union sanctions
Syrian oligarchs